|}

The Steventon  Stakes is a Listed flat horse race in Great Britain open to horses aged three years or older.
It is run at Newbury over a distance of 1 mile and 2 furlongs (2,012 metres), and it is scheduled to take place each year in July. It is currently sponsored by Bet365.

Records
Leading jockey (3 wins):
 Willie Carson – Polar Gap (1988), Luhuk (1994), Ihtiram (1995)
 Pat Eddery -  Citidancer (1989), Adversary (1991), Peto (1992) 
 Frankie Dettori - Adam Smith (1992), Sakhee (2001), Global Giant (2020) 

Leading trainer (5 wins):
 Henry Cecil – 	Citidancer (1989), 	Madame Dubois (1990), Peto (1992), Chester House (1998), Passage of Time (2008)
Saeed bin Suroor - Wall Street (1996), Sakhee (2001), Crime Scene (2009), Royal Empire (2013), Real World (2021)

Winners since 1988

See also
 Horse racing in Great Britain
 List of British flat horse races

References
 Paris-Turf: 
Racing Post:

Flat races in Great Britain
Newbury Racecourse
Open middle distance horse races